A cult of personality, or a cult of the leader, is the result of an effort which is made to create an idealized and heroic image of a leader by a government, often through unquestioning flattery and praise. Historically, it has developed through techniques of mass media, propaganda, fake news, spectacle, the arts, patriotism, and government-organized demonstrations and rallies. A cult of personality is similar to apotheosis, except that it is established by modern social engineering techniques, usually by the state or the party in one-party states and dominant-party states. A cult of personality often accompanies the leader of a totalitarian or authoritarian countries. It can also be seen in some monarchies, theocracies, failed democracies and even in liberal democracies.

Background

Throughout history, monarchs and other heads of state were often held in enormous reverence and were thought to be endowed with super-human qualities. Through the principle of the divine right of kings, notably in medieval Europe, rulers were said to hold office by the will of God or the gods. Ancient Egypt, Imperial Japan, the Inca, the Aztecs, Tibet, Siam (now Thailand), and the Roman Empire are especially noted for redefining monarchs as "god-kings". Furthermore, the Imperial cult of ancient Rome identified emperors and some members of their families with the divinely sanctioned authority (auctoritas) of the Roman State.

The spread of democratic and secular ideas in Europe and North America in the 18th and 19th centuries made it increasingly difficult for monarchs to preserve this aura. However, the subsequent development of mass media, such as radio, enabled political leaders to project a positive image of themselves onto the masses as never before. It was from these circumstances in the 20th century that the most notorious personality cults arose. Often these cults are a form of political religion.

The advent of the Internet and the World Wide Web in the 21st century has renewed the personality cult phenomenon. Disinformation via social media platforms and the twenty-four hour news cycle has enabled the widespread dissemination and acceptance of deceptive information and propaganda. As a result, personality cults have grown and remained popular in many places, corresponding with a marked rise in authoritarian government across the world.

The term "cult of personality" probably appeared in English around 1800–1850, along with the French and German use. At first, it had no political connotations, but was instead closely related to the Romanticist "cult of genius". The first political use of the phrase appeared in a letter from Karl Marx to German political worker Wilhelm Blos dated to November 10, 1877:

Characteristics
There are various views about what constitutes a cult of personality in a leader. Historian Jan Plamper wrote that modern-day personality cults display five characteristics that set them apart from "their predecessors": The cults are secular and "anchored in popular sovereignty"; their objects are all males; they target the entire population, not only the well-to-do or just the ruling class; they use mass media; they exist where the mass media can be controlled enough to inhibit the introduction of "rival cults".

In his 2013 paper, "What is character and why it really does matter", Thomas A. Wright stated, "The cult of personality phenomenon refers to the idealized, even god-like, public image of an individual consciously shaped and molded through constant propaganda and media exposure. As a result, one is able to manipulate others based entirely on the influence of public personality ... the cult of personality perspective focuses on the often shallow, external images that many public figures cultivate to create an idealized and heroic image."

Adrian Teodor Popan defined a cult of personality as a "quantitatively exaggerated and qualitatively extravagant public demonstration of praise of the leader." He also identified three causal "necessary, but not sufficient, structural conditions, and a path-dependent chain of events which, together, lead to the cult formation: a particular combination of patrimonialism and clientelism, lack of dissidence, and systematic falsification pervading the society's culture."

One underlying characteristic, as explained by John Pittman, is the nature of the cult of personalities to be a patriarch. The idea of the cult of personalities that coincides with the Marxist movements gains popular footing among the men in power with the idea that they would be the "fathers of the people". By the end of the 1920s, the male features of the cults became more extreme. Pittman identifies that these features became roles including the "formal role for a [male] 'great leader' as a cultural focus of the apparatus of the regime: reliance on top-down 'administrative measures': and a pyramidal structure of authority" which was created by a single ideal.

The role of mass media
The mass media have played an instrumental role in forging national leaders' cults of personality. The modern cult of personality has arisen in large part due to how the leader is presented through the media. The modern cult of personality developed alongside the media. The twentieth century brought technological advancements that made it possible for regimes to package propaganda in the form of radio broadcasts, films, and later content on the internet. Today, governments are capable of isolating citizens from the outside world and creating a monopoly of what citizens have access to, making it much easier to foster a cult of personality.

Writing in 2013, Thomas A. Wright observed that "[i]t is becoming evident that the charismatic leader, especially in politics, has increasingly become the product of media and self-exposure." Focusing on the media in the United States, Robert N. Bellah added, "It is hard to determine the extent to which the media reflect the cult of personality in American politics and to what extent they have created it. Surely they did not create it all alone, but just as surely they have contributed to it. In any case, American politics is dominated by the personalities of political leaders to an extent rare in the modern world ... in the personalized politics of recent years the 'charisma' of the leader may be almost entirely a product of media exposure."

Purpose

Often, a single leader became associated with this revolutionary transformation and came to be treated as a benevolent "guide" for the nation without whom the claimed transformation to a better future could not occur. Generally, this has been the justification for personality cults that arose in totalitarian societies, such as those of Adolf Hitler, Joseph Stalin, and Mao Zedong.

Admiration for Mao Zedong has remained widespread in China in spite of his actions. In December 2013, a Global Times poll revealed that over 85% of Chinese viewed Mao's achievements as outweighing his mistakes.

Jan Plamper argues while Napoleon III made some innovations in France, it was Benito Mussolini in Italy in the 1920s who originated the model of dictator-as-cult-figure that was emulated by Hitler, Stalin and the others, using the propaganda powers of a totalitarian state.

Pierre du Bois de Dunilac argues that the Stalin cult was elaborately constructed to legitimize his rule. Many deliberate distortions and falsehoods were used. The Kremlin refused access to archival records that might reveal the truth, and key documents were destroyed. Photographs were altered and documents were invented. People who knew Stalin were forced to provide "official" accounts to meet the ideological demands of the cult, especially as Stalin himself presented it in 1938 in Short Course on the History of the All-Union Communist Party (Bolsheviks), which became the official history.

Historian David L. Hoffmann states "The Stalin cult was a central element of Stalinism, and as such it was one of the most salient features of Soviet rule ... Many scholars of Stalinism cite the cult as integral to Stalin's power or as evidence of Stalin's megalomania."

In Latin America, Cas Mudde and Cristóbal Rovira Kaltwasser link the "cult of the leader" to the concept of the caudillo, a strong leader "who exercises a power that is independent of any office and free of any constraint." These populist strongmen are portrayed as "masculine and potentially violent" and enhance their authority through the use of the cult of personality. Mudde and Kaltwasser trace the linkage back to Juan Perón of Argentina.

States and systems with personality cults

Argentina

Juan Perón, who was elected three times as President of Argentina, and his second wife, Eva "Evita" Perón, were immensely popular among many of the Argentine people, and to this day they are still considered icons by the leading Justicialist Party. In contrast, academics and detractors often considered him a demagogue and a dictator. Perón sympathised with the Axis powers when he was a colonel and Minister of War and even served as a diplomatic envoy to Fascist Italy. During his regime he kept close ties with Francoist Spain. He ferociously persecuted dissents and potential political rivals, as political arrests were common during his first two terms. He eroded the republican principles of the country as a way to stay in power and forced statewide censorship on most media. Following his election, he built a personality cult around both himself and his wife so pervasive it is still a part of Argentina's current political life.

During Perón's regime, schools were forced to read Evita's biography La Razón de mi Vida, union and government jobs were only given to those who could prove themselves to be a fervent Peronist, newspapers were censored and television and radio networks were nationalized, and only state media was allowed. He often showed contempt for any opponents, regularly characterizing them as traitors and agents of foreign powers. Those who did not fall in line or were perceived as a threat to Perón's political power were subject to losing their jobs, threats, violence and harassment. Perón dismissed over 20,000 university professors and faculty members from all major public education institutions. Universities were then intervened, the faculty was pressured to get in line and those who resisted were blacklisted, dismissed or exiled. Numerous prominent cultural and intellectual figures were imprisoned. Thousands of artists, scientists, writers and academics left the country, migrated to North America or Europe. Union leaders and political rivals were arrested and tortured for years and were only released after Perón was deposed.

Azerbaijan

China

Mao Zedong 

Mao Zedong's cult of personality was a prominent part of Chairman Mao Zedong's rule over the People's Republic of China from his rise in 1949 until his death in 1976. Mass media, propaganda and a series of other techniques were used by the state to elevate Mao Zedong's status to that of an infallible heroic leader, who could stand up against The West, and guide China to become a beacon of Communism. Mao himself, however, publicly criticized the personality cult which was formed around him.

During the period of Cultural Revolution, Mao's personality cult soared to an unprecedented height. Mao's face was firmly established on the front page of People's Daily, where a column of his quotes was also printed every day. Mao's Selected Works were later printed in even greater circulation; the number of his portraits (1.2 billion) was more than the inhabitants in China. And soon Chairman Mao badges began to appear; in total, about 4.8 billion were manufactured. Every Chinese citizen was presented with the Little Red Book - a selection of quotes from Mao. It was prescribed to be carried everywhere and displayed at all public events, and citizens were expected to quote the contents of the book daily.

After the Cultural Revolution, Deng Xiaoping and others launched the "Boluan Fanzheng" program which invalidated the Cultural Revolution and abandoned (and forbade) the use of a personality cult. However, since Xi Jinping succeeded as the General Secretary of the Chinese Communist Party in 2012, the cult of personality has been promoted again in China.

Xi Jinping 

A cult of personality has been developing around Xi Jinping since he became General Secretary of the ruling Chinese Communist Party and the regime's paramount leader in 2012.

Fascist Italy

Benito Mussolini was portrayed as the embodiment of Italian Fascism and was keen to be seen as such. Mussolini was styled by other Italian fascists as Il Duce ("The Leader"). Since Mussolini was represented as an almost omniscient leader, a common saying in Italy during Mussolini's rule was "The Duce is always right" (Italian: Il Duce ha sempre ragione). Mussolini became a unifying force in Italy in order for ordinary Italians to put their difference to one side with local officials. The personality cult surrounding Mussolini became a way for him to justify his personal rule and it acted as a way to enable social and political integration.

Mussolini's military service in World War I and survival of failed assassination attempts were used to convey a mysterious aura around him. Fascist propaganda stated that Mussolini's body had been pierced by shrapnel just like St. Sebastian had been pierced by arrows, the difference being that Mussolini had survived this ordeal. Mussolini was also compared to St. Francis of Assisi, who had, like Mussolini, "suffered and sacrificed himself for others".

The press were given instructions on what and what not to write about Mussolini. Mussolini himself authorized which photographs of him were allowed to be published and rejected any photographs which made him appear weak or less prominent than he wanted to be portrayed as in a particular group.

Italy's war against Ethiopia (1935–37) was portrayed in propaganda as a revival of the Roman Empire, with Mussolini as the first Roman emperor Augustus. To improve his own image, as well as the image of Fascism in the Arab world, Mussolini declared himself to be the "Protector of Islam" during an official visit to Libya in 1937.

India

India's first prime minister Jawaharlal Nehru was known to foster a personality cult around himself. Many leaders opposed Nehru's style of functioning, his economic policies, and his socialist agenda. C Rajagopalachari criticized the personality cult surrounding Nehru, saying that there should be an opposition group within the Congress because it was running with "accelerators and no brakes" without a true opposition. Rajagopalachari later formed the liberal Swatantra Party because of his opposition to Nehru's style of functioning. The expression 'Nehruvian consensus' reflects the dominance of Nehruvian ideals, a product of Nehru's personality cult and the associated statism, i.e. the overarching faith in the state and the leadership. The Congress party has been accused of propagating a personality cult centered around Nehru, his daughter Indira Gandhi & the Nehru-Gandhi family.

Current Indian Prime Minister Narendra Modi is often criticized for creating a personality cult around him. Despite some setbacks and criticism, Modi's charisma and popularity was a key factor that helped the Bharatiya Janata Party (BJP) return to power in the 2019 Parliament elections. Shivraj Singh Chouhan, the chief minister of the country's second largest state, said in 2022, "He is superhuman and has traces of god in him." Opposition often accused Modi for spreading propaganda using popular media such as movies, television and web series, while the BJP has protested against a reality show in Tamil Nadu in which two children performed a skit about a vain and foppish king.

Nazi Germany

Starting in the 1920s, during the early years of the Nazi Party, Nazi propaganda began to depict the Nazi leader Adolf Hitler as a demagogue figure who was the almighty defender and savior of Germany. After the end of World War I and the Treaty of Versailles, the German people were left in turmoil under the Weimar Republic, and, according to Nazi propaganda, only Hitler could save them and restore Germany's greatness, which in turn gave rise to the "Führer-cult". During the five election campaigns in 1932, the Nazi newspaper Völkischer Beobachter portrayed Hitler as a man who had a mass movement united behind him, a man with one mission to solely save Germany as the 'Leader of the coming Germany'. The Night of the Long Knives in 1934 – after which Hitler referred to himself as being single-handedly "responsible for the fate of the German people" – also helped to reinforce the myth that Hitler was the sole protector of the Volksgemeinschaft, the ethnic community of the German people.

Nazi Propaganda Minister Joseph Goebbels cultivated an image of Hitler as a "heroic genius". The myth also gave rise to the saying and concept, "If only the Führer knew". Germans thought that problems which they ascribed to the Nazi hierarchy would not have occurred if Hitler had been aware of the situation; thus Nazi bigwigs were blamed, and Hitler escaped criticism.

British historian Ian Kershaw published his book The "Hitler Myth": Image and Reality in the Third Reich in 1987 and wrote:

During the early 1930s, the myth was given credence due to Hitler's perceived ability to revive the German economy during the Great Depression. However, Albert Speer wrote that by 1939, the myth was under threat and the Nazis had to organize cheering crowds to turn up to events. Speer wrote:

The myth helped to unite the German people during World War II, especially against the Soviet Union and the Western Allies. During Hitler's early victories against Poland and Western Europe the myth was at its peak, but when it became obvious to most Germans that the war was lost then the myth was exposed and Hitler's popularity declined.

A report is given in the little Bavarian town of Markt Schellenberg on March 11, 1945:

North Korea

The North Korean cult of personality surrounding its ruling family, the Kim family, has existed for decades and can be found in many examples of North Korean culture. Although not acknowledged by the North Korean government, many defectors and Western visitors state there are often stiff penalties for those who criticize or do not show "proper" respect for the regime. The personality cult began soon after Kim Il-sung took power in 1948, and was greatly expanded after his death in 1994.

The pervasiveness and extreme nature of North Korea's personality cult surpasses that of even Joseph Stalin or Mao Zedong. The cult is also marked by the intensity of the people's feelings for and devotion to their leaders, and the key role played by a Confucianized ideology of familism both in maintaining the cult and thereby in sustaining the regime itself. The North Korean cult of personality is a large part of Juche and totalitarianism.

Peru

Philippines

Poland

Romania

Russia

Soviet Union

The first cult of personality to take shape in the USSR was Vladimir Lenin. Up until the dissolution of the USSR, Lenin's portrait and quotes were a ubiquitous part of the culture. However, during his lifetime, Lenin vehemently denounced any effort to build a cult of personality as in his eyes the cult of personality was antithetical to Marxism. Despite this, members of the Communist Party further used Lenin's image as the all knowing revolutionary who would liberate the proletariat. Lenin attempted to take action against this; however it was halted as Lenin was nearly assassinated in August 1918. His health would only further decline as he suffered numerous severe strokes with the worst in May 1922 and March 1923. In this state Lenin would lose the ability to walk and speak. It was during this time that the Communist Party began to promote the accomplishments of Lenin as the basis for his cult of personality, using him as an image of morality and revolutionary ideas.

After Vladimir Lenin's death in 1924 and the exile of Leon Trotsky, Joseph Stalin came to embody the Soviet Union. Once Lenin's cult of personality had risen in power, creating enough influence, Stalin integrated his ideals into his own cult. Unlike other cults of personalities, the Lenin and Stalin cults were not created to give the leaders power, they were created to give power and validation to the Communist Party. Stalin initially spoke out against the cult and other outrageous and false claims centered around him. However Stalin's attitude began to shift in favor of the cult in the 1930s and he began to encourage it following the Great Purge. Seldom did Stalin object to state actions that furthered his cult of personality, however he did oppose some initiatives from Soviet propagandists. When Nikolai Yezhov proposed to rename Moscow to "Stalinodar", which translates to "gift of Stalin", Stalin objected. To merge the idea of the Lenin and Stalin cults together, Stalin changed aspects of Lenin's life in the public's eye in order to place himself in power. This kept the two cults in a line that showed that both Lenin and Stalin had the same ideas and that Stalin was the rightful successor of Lenin, leading the USSR in the fashion Lenin would have.

In December 1929, Stalin celebrated his 50th birthday which made Stalin become a prominent feature in the Soviet press. The Soviet press used positive adjectives like, "Great", "Beloved", "Bold", "Wise", "Inspirer", and "Genius" to describe him. Similarly, speeches that were given by people to the peasants described Stalin as "Our Best Collective Farm Worker", "Our Shockworker, Our Best of Best", and "Our Darling, Our Guiding Star". By 1934, under Stalin's full control of the country, socialist realism became the endorsed method of art and literature. Even under the communist regime, the Stalin cult of personality portrayed Stalin's leadership as patriarchy under the features laid out during Khrushchev's speech. After 1936, the Soviet press described Stalin as the "Father of Nations".

One key element of Soviet propaganda was interactions between Stalin and the children of the Soviet Union. He was often photographed with children of different ethnic backgrounds of the Soviet Union and was often photographed giving gifts to children. In 1935 the phrase, "Thank You, Dear Comrade Stalin, for a Happy Childhood!" started to appear above doorways at nurseries, orphanages, and schools; children also chanted this slogan at festivals. Another key element of Soviet propaganda was imagery of Stalin and Lenin. In many posters, Stalin and Lenin were placed together to show their camaraderie and that their ideals were one. Throughout the 1930s, posters with both images were used as a way to bring the nation and the military together under the policies of the Communist Party during World War II, with the idea of Lenin as the father of the revolutionary ideas and Stalin as the disciple who would fulfill the communist ideals. Stalin was also portrayed in numerous films produced by Mosfilm, which remained a Soviet-led company until the fall of the Soviet Union.

Turkey

United Kingdom

United States

Venezuela

See also

 Authoritarian personality
 Big Brother (Nineteen Eighty-Four)
 Bolivarianism
 Bonapartism
 Bread and circuses
 Celebrity worship syndrome
 Charismatic authority
 Chavismo
 Communism
 Cult of Personality (song)
 Dictatorship
 Erdoğanism
 Fascism
 Fujimorism
 Gandhism
 God complex
 Great man theory
 Halo effect
 Horn effect
 Hoxhaism
 Kemalism
 Khomeinism
 Kirchnerism
 Leaderism
 Leninism
 Lèse-majesté
 List of cults of personality
 List of messiah claimants
 Maoism
 Narcissism
 Narcissistic leadership
 Nasserism
 Nazism
 Peronism
 Pinochetism
 Putinism
 Supreme leader
 Sycophancy
 Titoism
 Trotskyism
 Trumpism

References

Sources

Further reading
 Apor, Balázs; Behrends, Jan C.; Jones, Polly; and Rees, E. A. (2004) eds. The Leader Cult in Communist Dictatorships: Stalin and the Eastern Bloc. London: Palgrave Macmillan. .
 
 
 
 
 Morgan, Kevin (2017) International Communism and the Cult of the Individual Leaders, Tribunes and Martyrs under Lenin and Stalin. London: Palgrave Macmillan. 
 
 Petrone, Karen (2004) "Cult of Personality" in Millar, J. R. ed. Encyclopedia of Russian History. v. 1, pp. 348–350
 
 Rutland, P. (2011) "Cult of Personality" i. Kurian, G. T. ed, The Encyclopedia of Political Science. Washington. D.C.: CQ Press. v. 1, p. 365
 Vassilev, Rossen (2008) "Cult of Personality" in Darity, W. A., Jr. ed. International Encyclopedia of the Social Sciences.

External links
 Why Dictators Love Kitsch by Eric Gibson, The Wall Street Journal, August 10, 2009

 
Dictatorship
Political terminology